Jey Kugeler (18 April 1910 – 25 August 1983) was a Luxembourgian gymnast. He competed at the 1936 Summer Olympics, the 1948 Summer Olympics and the 1952 Summer Olympics.

References

1910 births
1983 deaths
Luxembourgian male artistic gymnasts
Olympic gymnasts of Luxembourg
Gymnasts at the 1936 Summer Olympics
Gymnasts at the 1948 Summer Olympics
Gymnasts at the 1952 Summer Olympics
People from Schifflange